Alex Portal (born 12 February 2002 in Saint-Germain-en-Laye) is a French Paralympic swimmer. At the 2020 Summer Paralympics, he won a bronze medal in the Men's 400 metre freestyle S13 event.

References

External links
 
 

2002 births
Living people
French male freestyle swimmers
Paralympic swimmers of France
Paralympic silver medalists for France
Paralympic bronze medalists for France
Paralympic medalists in swimming
Swimmers at the 2020 Summer Paralympics
Medalists at the 2020 Summer Paralympics
Medalists at the World Para Swimming Championships
People from Saint-Germain-en-Laye
Sportspeople from Yvelines
French male medley swimmers
S13-classified Paralympic swimmers
21st-century French people